Sandy Skoglund (born September 11, 1946) is an American photographer and installation artist.

Skoglund creates surrealist images by building elaborate sets or tableaux, furnishing them with carefully selected colored furniture and other objects, a process of which takes her months to complete. Finally, she photographs the set, mostly including live models.  The works are characterized by an overwhelming amount of one object and either bright, contrasting colors or a monochromatic color scheme.

Biography
Skoglund was born in Weymouth, Massachusetts on September 11, 1946. She spent her childhood all over the country including the states Maine, Connecticut, and California. She studied both art history and studio art at Smith College in Northampton, Massachusetts, graduating in 1968. In 1967, she studied art history through her college's study abroad program at the Sorbonne and École du Louvre in Paris, France. After graduating in 1969, she went to graduate school at the University of Iowa, where she studied filmmaking, multimedia art, and printmaking. In 1971, she earned her Master of Arts and in 1972 a Master of Fine Arts in painting.

In 1972, Skoglund began working as a conceptual artist in New York City. She taught herself photography to document her artistic endeavors, and experimenting with themes of repetition.  She also become interested in advertising and high technology—trying to marry the commercial look with a noncommercial purpose, combining the technical focus found in the commercial world and bringing that into the fine art studio. Skoglund created repetitive, process-oriented art  through the techniques of mark-making and photocopying. For example, her 1973 Crumpled and Copied artwork centered on her repeatedly crumpled and photocopied a piece of paper. In 1978, she had produced a series of repetitious food item still life images. These photographs of food were presented in geometric and brightly colored environments so that the food becomes an integral part to the overall patterning, as in Cubed Carrots and Kernels of Corn, with its checkerboard of carrots on a white-spotted red plate placed on a cloth in the same pattern.  Skoglund's works are quirky and idiosyncratic, and as former photography critic for The New York Times Andy Grundberg describes, they "evoke adult fears in a playful, childlike context".

One of her most-known works, entitled Radioactive Cats, features green-painted clay cats running amok in a gray kitchen. An older man sits in a chair with his back facing the camera while his elderly wife looks into a refrigerator that is the same color as the walls. "The artist sculpted the life-size cats herself using chicken wire and plaster, and painted them bright green. She acquired used furniture and constructed a painted gray set, then asked two elderly neighbors living in her apartment building in New York City to pose as models." The end product is a very evocative photograph.  In an on-line  Getty Center for Education in the Arts forum, Terry Barrett and Sydney Walker (2013) identify two viable interpretations of Radioactive Cats. The first is about social indifference to the elderly and the second is nuclear war and its aftermath, suggested by the artist’s title.

Her 1990 work, "Fox Games", has a similar feel to Radioactive Cats"; it unleashes the imagination of the viewer is allowed to roam freely. A third and final often recognized piece by her features numerous fish hovering above people in bed late at night and is called Revenge of the Goldfish.  The piece was used as cover art for the Inspiral Carpets album of the same name.

Skoglund was an art professor at the University of Hartford between 1973 and 1976.

In 2000, the Galerie Guy Bärtschi in Geneva, Switzerland held an exhibition of 30 works by Sandy Skoglund, which served as a modest retrospective. The photographs ranged from the plates on tablecloths of the late 1970s to the more spectacular works of the 1980s and 1990s. The critic who reviewed the exhibition, Richard Leydier, commented that Skoglund criticism is littered with interpretations of all kinds, whether feminist, sociological, psychoanalytical or whatever. But, Skoglund claims not to be aware of these reading, saying, "What is the meaning of my work? For me, it's really in doing it."

In 2008, Skoglund completed a series titled "True Fiction Two". This project is similar to the "True Fiction" series that she began in 1986. This series was not completed due to the discontinuation of materials that Skoglund was using. Kodak canceled the production of the dye that Skoglund was using for her prints. Each image in "True Fiction Two" has been meticulously crafted to assimilate the visual and photographic possibilities now available in digital processes.

Her works are held in numerous museum collections including the Museum of Contemporary Photography, San Francisco Museum of Modern Art, Montclair Art Museum and Dayton Art Institute.

Skoglund holds a faculty position at the Department of Arts, Culture and Media of Rutgers University–Newark in Newark, New Jersey.

References

External links

 Sandy Skoglund's Official Page
Inception Gallery website
Rule Gallery
Skoglund, Sandy. Babies at Paradise Pond. 1996. Five Colleges and Historic Deerfield Museum Consortium, Smith College.

Further reading
Faulconer Gallery, Daniel Strong, Milton Severe, Marvin Heiferman, and Douglas Dreishpoon. Raining Popcorn: Sandy Skoglund. Grinnell, Iowa: Grinnell College, Faulconer Gallery, 2001.

Rosenblum, Robert, Linda Muehlig, Ann H. Sievers, Carol Squiers, and Sandy Skoglund. Sandy Skoglund: Reality Under Siege : a Retrospective''. London: Harry N. Abrams, 1998.

1946 births
Living people
American people of Swedish descent
Smith College alumni
University of Paris alumni
University of Iowa alumni
University of Hartford faculty
Rutgers University faculty
20th-century American photographers
Photographers from Iowa
21st-century American photographers
20th-century American women photographers
21st-century American women photographers
American women academics